Sherlock Holmes's War of the Worlds is a sequel to H. G. Wells's science fiction novel The War of the Worlds, written by Manly Wade Wellman and his son Wade Wellman, and published in 1975. It is a pastiche crossover which combines H. G. Wells's 1897 extraterrestrial invasion story with Sir Arthur Conan Doyle's Sherlock Holmes and Professor Challenger stories. The book is composed of stories originally published in The Magazine of Fantasy & Science Fiction.

Plot
The story consists of the adventures of Sherlock Holmes, Dr. Watson, and Professor Challenger in London during the Martian invasion as described in Wells's novel.

Background
The book was inspired by a viewing of A Study in Terror.

The underlying philosophy of the book is very different to, indeed contradictory to, the original Wells story in which the idea is repeatedly expressed of humans being completely helpless before the Martian invaders, as other creatures are before humans. Conversely, in the Wellmans' book Holmes, Watson, and Challenger continually confront and outwit the Martians, undeterred by the invaders' technological superiority.

The story features a romantic relationship between Holmes and his landlady Mrs. Hudson, of which Watson is oblivious.

Reissues
 Titan Books reprinted the book in 2009, under the title of The Further Adventures of Sherlock Holmes: The War of the Worlds as part of its Further Adventures series, which collects a number of noted pastiches.

See also

 Sherlock Holmes pastiches

References

External links
 
 [http://titanbooks.com/the-further-adventures-of-sherlock-holmes-war-of-the-worlds-4522/ Sherlock Holmes's War of The Worlds] at Titan Books

1975 American novels
Crossover novels
Professor Challenger novels
Sherlock Holmes novels
Sherlock Holmes pastiches
War of the Worlds written fiction
Wold Newton family
Sequel novels
1975 science fiction novels
1975 fantasy novels
Novels set in London